Doli Gutta is a peak in the northern part of the Deccan Plateau. It is located at the border of Mulugu district in Telangana and Bijapur district in Chhattisgarh, India.

Highest point in Telangana
At 965 m Doli Gutta is the highest peak in the state of Telangana since the Chintoor and Vararamachandrapuram mandals of erstwhile Khammam district — where  Pedda Konda rose to a height of 1360 m— were transferred to Andhra Pradesh.  On 11 July 2014, the Lok Sabha approved a bill transferring seven mandals of Khammam district (Kukunoor, Velairpadu, Bhurgampadu, Chintoor, Kunavaram, Vararamachandrapuram and Bhadrachalam) back to Andhra Pradesh, in order to facilitate the Polavaram Irrigation project. Bhadrachalam town was given to Telangana during the division. Originally, a part of Madras presidency, these regions were added to Khammam district of erstwhile Andhra Pradesh for convenience and later divided between Telangana and Andhra Pradesh

See also
Geography of Telangana
List of mountains in India
List of mountains by elevation

References

External links
Doli Gutta Map - India - Mapcarta

Mountains of Telangana
Deccan Plateau
Highest points of Indian states and union territories